Waldron–Beck House and Carriage House is a historic home and carriage house located at Lafayette, Tippecanoe County, Indiana.  The house was built in 1877, and is a two-story, irregularly shaped Italianate style brick dwelling, with a rear service wing. It sits on a stone foundation and has a multi-hipped roof with bracketed cornice.  It features a three-sided, two-story projecting bay. The carriage house is a two-story, three bay brick building. It has a hipped roof with cupola and a bracketed cornice.

It was listed on the National Register of Historic Places in 1984.

References

Houses on the National Register of Historic Places in Indiana
Italianate architecture in Indiana
Houses completed in 1877
Buildings and structures in Lafayette, Indiana
National Register of Historic Places in Tippecanoe County, Indiana
Houses in Tippecanoe County, Indiana
1877 establishments in Indiana